Aethes pemeantensis is a species of moth of the family Tortricidae. It is endemic to France.

Adults are on wing in July.

References

pemeantensis
Moths described in 1985
Moths of Europe